Joanna Liszowska, (wł. Joanna Patrycja Liszowska Serneke) (born 12 December 1978 in Kraków), is a Polish actress, singer and model.

In 2007, Liszowska won the 2nd season of Jak oni śpiewają, the Polish edition of "Soapstar Superstar".

From 2012, she is a juror in the Polish program "Got to Dance – Tylko Taniec"

Filmography 
 Szpital na perypetiach (2002) – Edyta Kąkola-Kulawik
 Kasia i Tomek (2003) – Ewa
 M jak miłość (TV series, 2003–2004) – Zuzia - a nurse
 Miodowe lata (TV series, 2003) – Joanna
 Psie serce (TV, 2003) – Ala ("Max")
 Rodzinka (2003) – Eliza Przepiórka
 Czwarta władza (2004) – Maryla
 Święta polskie (TV series, 2004)
 Kryminalni (TV series, 2005–2006) – Iza - journalist
 Kto nigdy nie żył... (2005) – Ela
 Lawstorant (2005) – Marta
 Legenda (2005) – Lucyna
 Na dobre i na złe (TV) – Dorota Lewkiewicz-Czyż, radiologist
 U fryzjera (TV, 2006) – Laura
 Who Never Lived (2006)
 Sztuczki (2007) – Violka

Discography 
 2007: Jak Oni Śpiewają?

External links

1978 births
Actresses from Kraków
Living people
Musicians from Kraków
Polish soap opera actresses
Polish television actresses
Polish pop singers
21st-century Polish singers
21st-century Polish women singers